Placochilus seladonicus is a species of insect in the family Miridae, the plant bugs.

Subspecies
Subspecies include:
Placochilus seladonicus mediterraneus Josifov, 1969 
Placochilus seladonicus seladonicus (Fallén, 1807

Distribution and habitat
This species is present in most of Europe. It can be found on dry meadows, roadsides, as well as on areas with tall grassy vegetation or where the preferred host plants live.

Description
These small mirids show a dull, whitish blue or gray green body and  big eyes.

Biology
Placochilus seladonicus is a univoltine species. Adults can be found from mid June to mid August. Eggs overwinter. Nymphs and adults feed on leaves and stems of various plants, especially on flower heads or flower buds of field scabious (Knautia arvensis) that match the color of adult insects.

Bibliography
NAU, B.S. 1994. Notes on Placochilus seladonicus (Fall.) (Hem., Miridae) in Britain. Entomologist's Monthly Magazine, 130: 209-210
NAU, B.S. 1978. Two plant bugs new to Britain, Placochilus seladonicus (Fall) and Campylomma annulicornis (Sig.) (Heteroptera, Miridae). Entomologist's Monthly Magazine, 114,157-159.

References

External links
 Insecta.pro

Mirinae
Insects described in 1807